Charles J. Walsh, S.J. was appointed Santa Clara University's 21st president after the presidency of Louis C. Rudolph.

References

Gerald McKevitt, S.J. The University of Santa Clara: A History, 1851-1977 (Page 331)
https://web.archive.org/web/20101221032157/http://scu.edu/president/history/past.cfm

1816 births
1897 deaths
19th-century American Jesuits
20th-century American Jesuits
Presidents of Santa Clara University